The Dublin University Championships also called the Dublin University LT Championships was a men's tennis tournament held from 1877 through 1909.

History
The Dublin University Championships was played at the Dublin University Lawn Tennis Club, Trinity College, Ireland initially played on outdoor hard (asphalt) courts from 1877 to 1891, then switched grass courts. There were eighteen editions of the event.

Past tournaments
Incomplete list of tournaments included:

Men's singles

References

External links
http://www.tennisarchives.com/Dublin University LT Championships

Grass court tennis tournaments
Hard court tennis tournaments
Tennis tournaments in Ireland
Defunct tennis tournaments in the Republic of Ireland
Defunct sports competitions in the Republic of Ireland